Terry Eames (born 13 October 1957) is an English football manager and former professional player.

Career

Playing career
Eames, who played as a full back, began his career with Crystal Palace, before making his professional debut in 1977 with Wimbledon, making 47 appearances in the Football League over the next three years. He later played non-league football with Dulwich Hamlet, Leatherhead and Kingstonian.

Coaching career
Eames was appointed as the first manager of AFC Wimbledon in 2002, before being suspended in February 2004 on disciplinary grounds. He was sacked later that month. After leaving that position, Eames became manager of Ash United in May 2004. He began his second spell as manager of Forest in February 2008. Eames was appointed manager of Sussex County Division 3 team Roffey in November 2011. He left the role in December 2015.

References

1957 births
Living people
English footballers
English football managers
Crystal Palace F.C. players
Wimbledon F.C. players
Dulwich Hamlet F.C. players
Leatherhead F.C. players
Kingstonian F.C. players
English Football League players
AFC Wimbledon managers
Ash United F.C. managers
Association football fullbacks